PLCL may refer to:

 Park Lane College Leeds, a former British further education college, now part of Leeds City College
 Parker Lewis Can't Lose, a 1990s television series